Nyulnyul is an dormant Australian Aboriginal language, formerly spoken by the Nyulnyul people of Western Australia.

Mary Carmel Charles is documented as the last fluent speaker of the Nyulnyul language of Western Australia.

Phonology

Consonants 
Nyulnyul has seventeen consonant phonemes, with five distinct places of articulation. yulnyul is a morphologically complex language with both prefixing and suffixing.

Vowels 
Nyulnyul uses a three vowel system, with contrastive length for all vowels.

Classification
Nyulnyul is very closely related to and was possibly mutually intelligible with Bardi, Jawi, Jabirrjabirr and Nimanburru. These are all members of the Western Nyulnyulan subgroup of Nyulnyulan, a non-Pama-Nyungan family of northern Australia. It is possible that Ngumbarl also belongs to this group, although Bowern makes arguments from the Daisy Bates/Billingee records that Ngumbarl is an Eastern Nyulnyulan language. Speakers consider these all to be distinct.

Grammar
Nyulnyul is a morphologically complex language with both prefixing and suffixing. The language has an ergative alignment system. Nouns do not have classes, but case on phrases is marked through bound postpositions. Verbs roots are inflected for person and number of its subject, tense, mood and voice through prefixes. A number of suffixes with different meanings can also optionally be used. Verbs are also used in compound verb constructions where a non-inflecting preverb is used together with an inflected verb. The language also has a number of adverbs and particles.

Clauses can also be constructed without the use of verbs when presentative, attributive or identifying. The word order is free.

References

Literature

Nyulnyulan languages
Extinct languages of Western Australia
Kimberley (Western Australia)
Languages extinct in the 1990s
Indigenous Australian languages in Western Australia